Fernand Sastre (1 October 1923 – 13 June 1998) was a French football official who was President of the French Football Federation from 1972 to 1984.

The Le Centre Technique National Fernand Sastre, better known as Clairefontaine, is named after him. He died right after three days when the 1998 FIFA World Cup began to roll at his homeland. Following France's World Cup victory later, the French squad dedicated the victory to him for his role of developing French football.

He was awarded the FIFA Order of Merit in 1998, the year of his death.

External links
FIFA interview
FIFA news release

1923 births
1998 deaths
Association football executives
French football chairmen and investors
People from Kouba
Pieds-Noirs
Deaths from cancer in France
Presidents of the French Football Federation